José Pablo Torcuato Batlle y Ordóñez ( or ; 23 May 1856 in Montevideo, Uruguay – 20 October 1929), nicknamed Don Pepe, was a prominent Uruguayan politician, who served two terms as President of Uruguay for the Colorado Party. He was the son of a former president and was widely praised for his introduction of his political system, Batllism, to South America and for his role in modernizing Uruguay through his creation of extensive welfare state reforms.

In 1898, he served as interim president for a few weeks. He was later elected to the presidency for two terms: from 1903 to 1907 and from 1911 to 1915. He remains one of the most popular Uruguayan presidents, mainly due to his role as a social reformer. Influenced by Krausist liberalism, he is known for introducing unemployment compensation, universal suffrage and the eight-hour workday, as well as free high school education. He was one of the main promoters of Uruguayan secularization, which leaded to the division of the state and the Catholic Church.

Early life and background
Batlle was born in Montevideo on May 23, 1856, to Lorenzo Batlle y Grau and Amalia Ordoñez. Batlle’s grandfather, José Batlle y Carreó, had arrived in Montevideo on his own ship with Batlle’s grandmother from Sitges, a town near Barcelona, and built a flour mill which won a contract to provision the Royal Spanish Navy in Montevideo. Batlle’s grandfather was loyal to the Spanish crown through both the British invasions of the River Plate and the first and second attempts to secure Uruguayan independence from Spain led by José Gervasio Artigas, and subsequently returned to Spain in 1814, and the rest of the Batlle family followed in 1818. Batlle’s grandmother died in Sitjes in 1823, and his grandfather subsequently returned to Montevideo in 1833 to reopen the flour mill. Batlle’s father Lorenzo had been born in Uruguay in 1810, and returned the Montevideo three years before the rest of the family in 1830, after an extensive education in France and Spain. Batlle’s father quickly joined and became prominent within the Colorados, and was involved in the Uruguayan Civil War, notably personally escorting Fructuoso Rivera to exile in Brazil in 1847. Lorenzo Batlle married Batlle’s mother, the daughter of another Colorado guerrilla, during the Uruguayan Civil War.

Batlle’s father Lorenzo had served as Minister of War during the Great Siege of Montevideo, and was elected President of Uruguay in 1868 when Batlle was 12 years old. He was also the uncle of another Uruguayan President, Luis Batlle Berres and the great-uncle of President Jorge Batlle, and his uncle-in-law Duncan Stewart served as acting president for three weeks in 1894.

After attending an English school in Montevideo, Batlle began studying at the University of the Republic. At university, he became involved in the discussions and debates between the 'idealists' and 'positivists'. Led by Prudencio Váquez y Vega, Batlle was a prominent member of the idealists. Batlle’s political ideology was influenced by the work of philosopher Heinrich Ahrens, whose work was introduced to Batlle by Váquez y Vega. Batlle left university in 1879 without completing his law degree. The following year, in 1880, a 24-year-old Batlle convinced his father to let him study for a year in Paris, where he took a course in English and sat in on philosophy lectures at the Sorbonne and Collège de France before returning home when money ran out.

Batlle was a prominent journalist and founded El Día newspaper in 1886. Batlle used his newspaper as a political platform for criticizing his opponents and promoting his reformist agenda.

Political career
His appointment was short-lived, for he resigned after six months to seek election to the Chamber of Deputies as a candidate on the Colorado ticket. After a disagreement with then-president Máximo Tajes, however, Batlle lost his spot on the ticket. He was eventually elected in 1891 as a deputy for the department of Salto, and quickly rose to further prominence within the Colorado party.

Senate
Batlle was elected as a senator for Montevideo Department in November 1898, and rapidly became President of the Senate of Uruguay. As the President of the Senate was (at the time) the first in line to the presidency, Batlle briefly served as the acting President of Uruguay while Juan Lindolfo Cuestas stepped aside to legitimate his de facto presidency in 1899.

At elections in 1900, however, the Colorados performed poorly, and dissident Colorado senators elected Juan Carlos Blanco Fernández as President of the Senate by one vote. Batlle would later briefly regain the position of President of the Senate in February 1903 before becoming President of the Republic.

First Presidency (1903–07)

Revolution of 1904

In 1904 Batlle's government forces successfully ended the intermittent Uruguayan Civil War which had persisted for many years, when the opposing National Party leader Aparicio Saravia was killed at the battle of Masoller. Without their leader, Saravia's followers abandoned their fight, starting a period of relative peace.

Social reforms
During Batlle y Ordóñez's term in office, secularization became a major political issue. Uruguay banned crucifixes in hospitals by 1906, and eliminated references to God and the Gospel in public oaths. Divorce laws were also established during this time. He led Uruguay's delegation to the Second Hague Conference and was noted for his peace proposals there. Much of the time between his two terms Batlle spent travelling in Europe and picking up ideas for new political and social reforms, which he introduced during his second term.

Second Presidency (1911–15)

In 1913, influenced by visiting and studying French and Swiss politics between his first and second terms, Batlle proposed a reorganization of the government which would replace the presidency with a nine-member National Council of Administration, similar to the Swiss Federal Council. Batlle’s proposal for a collective leadership body was defeated in 1916 referendum, but he managed to establish a model in which executive powers were split between the Presidency and the National Council of Administration when a variant of his proposal was implemented with the Constitution of 1918.

Economy
During Batlle's second term, he began a new movement, Batllism, which involved concerted state action against foreign economic imperialism. He fought for such things as unemployment compensation (1914), eight-hour workdays (1915), and universal suffrage. As president, Batlle introduced a wide range of reforms in areas such as social security and working conditions.

All of this brought about great government involvement in the economy. Private monopolies were turned into government monopolies, and tariffs were imposed on foreign products, including machinery and raw material imports. The growth of the meat processing industry stimulated the livestock industry, Uruguay's main source of wealth.

Education
Education started a process of great expansion from the mid-to-late 19th century onward. It became the key to success for the middle class community. The state established free high school education and created more high schools through the country. The university was also opened to women, and educational enrollment increased throughout the country.

First Presidency of the National Council of Administration (1921–1923)
At the 1920 Uruguayan general election, Batlle was elected to his first term on the National Council of Administration. He subsequently served as its president for a two-year term from 1 March 1921 to 1 March 1923 alongside president Baltasar Brum.

Second Presidency of the National Council of Administration (1927–1928)
At the 1926 Uruguayan general election, Batlle was elected to a new term on the National Council of Administration. He served again as its president from 1 March 1927 for just under one year, alongside new president Juan Campisteguy, until he was succeeded by Luis C. Caviglia on 16 February 1928.

Later life
In early 1920 Batlle killed Washington Beltrán Barbat, a National Party deputy, in a formal duel that stemmed from vitriolic editorials published in Batlle's El Día newspaper and Beltrán's El País. His son Washington Beltrán would become President of Uruguay. He also served twice as Chairman of the National Council of Administration (1921–1923, 1927–1928).

After suffering abdominal pain for some time, Battle admitted himself to the Italian Hospital of Montevideo on September 18, 1929 for the first of two planned operations. While Batlle had made somewhat of a recovery a month later (with the second operation planned for another two or three months later), he had suffered some setbacks. Around midday on October 20, Battle suffered the first of two thromboembolisms, with the second one later that afternoon proving fatal.

Legacy

The first implementation of the  system which Batlle had championed, the National Council of Administration, was overthrown in a coup by president Gabriel Terra in 1933 and abolished by the third Constitution of Uruguay in 1934, a little over four years after Batlle’s death. The idea of the  system remained influential, however, and was reintroduced with the 1952 Constitution of Uruguay in the form of the National Council of Government. The National Council of Government fully abolished the presidency, making it closer to Batlle’s desired system, but was itself abolished for a second time and the presidency re-established by the 1967 constitution.

A public park and a neighborhood in Montevideo are named after him.

There is also a town in Lavalleja Department named after him.

See also
 List of political families

Notes

References

Bibliography

External links

 
 
 

1856 births
1929 deaths
People from Montevideo
Uruguayan people of Catalan descent
Colorado Party (Uruguay) politicians
Presidents of Uruguay
Prime Ministers of Uruguay
Education and Culture Ministers of Uruguay
Presidents of the Senate of Uruguay
Uruguayan agnostics
Male feminists
Uruguayan feminists
Uruguayan duellists
Children of presidents of Uruguay
Deaths from thrombosis
Burials at the Central Cemetery of Montevideo